George Alfred Turner "Tubby" Vials (18 March 1887 – 26 April 1974) was an English cricketer who played first-class cricket for Northamptonshire from 1905 to 1922 and was club captain from 1911 to 1913. 

Vials was a right-handed batsman. His highest score was 129, against Hampshire in 1909 at Northampton, when Northamptonshire won by one wicket. His other century came in 1910 at Sheffield, when he scored 100, easily the highest score in the match; in the absence of the regular captain, Thomas Manning, Vials captained Northamptonshire to their first victory over Yorkshire. Under his captaincy in 1912 Northamptonshire finished a close second in the County Championship. 

A knee injury and his work as a solicitor in Northampton limited his cricket after 1912. However, he remained involved with the cricket club until his death. He was club president from 1956 to 1968.

A native of Northampton who also died there, Vials attended Wellingborough School, not far from Northampton. He also played football for Northampton Town F.C. and hockey for Northamptonshire.

References

External links
 
 

1887 births
1974 deaths
People educated at Wellingborough School
English cricketers
Northamptonshire cricketers
Cricketers from Northampton
Northamptonshire cricket captains